Assal al-Ward (also spelled Asal el-Ward) is a town in southern Syria, administratively part of the Rif Dimashq Governorate, located northeast of Damascus along the Syrian–Lebanese borders. Nearby localities include Hala, Hosh Arab and al-Qutayfah to the southeast, Rankous, Saidnaya, Douma and al-Tawani to the south. According to the Syria Central Bureau of Statistics, Assal al-Ward had a population of 5,812 in the 2004 census. The town is also the administrative center of the Assal al-Ward nahiyah which consists of three towns with a combined population of 8,766. Its inhabitants are predominantly Sunni Muslims.

History
Assal al-Ward ("the rose makers") was long famous for its flower produce. The flowers produced in the town were supplied to the attar makers of Damascus. But unrestricted grazing reduced the town's once burgeoning yearly harvest of sixty to seventy Kantars (hundredweights) to one or one and a half by the end of the 19th century. During the early 1870s, the village was described as a "well-to-do place" with an entirely Shafi'i Muslim population. Armed men from the village possessed about 250 guns and were led by a local chief, Shaykh Salih. The inhabitants were noted for their hospitality, intelligence and willingness to fight. In 1874, the town was visited by British geographer, Sir Richard Francis Burton, and he noted that the town was affluent, with cool fresh air and healthy inhabitants. In its Quarterly Statement of 1892, the Palestine Exploration Fund described Assal al-Ward as a "village of a few hundred people" with a cool water spring.

Geography
The large Tertiary-Quaternary basin of Assal al-Ward is watered by several springs, and drains northwards towards the towns of Jayroud and an-Nabek.

References

Bibliography

 

 
 
 

Populated places in Yabroud District
Towns in Syria